JurisPedia  is a wiki-based online encyclopedia of academic law in many languages, currently available in Arabic, Chinese, English, French, German, Spanish and Dutch. It was started in October 2004, inspired in part by Wikipedia and the Enciclopedia Libre (University of Seville). JurisPedia runs on the MediaWiki software, but it is not a Wikimedia Foundation project.

The site, one of the largest legal encyclopedias and  online legal references, won the Dieter Meurer Prize for Legal Informatics for 2009.

Since 2012, JurisPedia is member of the Free Access to Law Movement.

On 10 March 2014, the French version of Jurispedia and the Bar Association of Paris have signed an agreement to take part in the creation of the "Great Library of Law".

See also 

 Comparative law wiki
 List of online encyclopedias

References

External links 
JurisPedia home page
Article about JurisPedia  (United Nations Economic and Social Commission for Western Asia, World Summit on the Information Society).
 Esther Hoorn, "Using the Wiki-Environment of Jurispedia in Legal Education, BILETA Annual Conference 2006 Malta, April 2006.

Creative Commons-licensed websites
MediaWiki websites
Wiki communities
Online encyclopedias
Encyclopedias of law
Free Access to Law Movement
Multilingual websites